The 2003 Critérium du Dauphiné Libéré was the 55th edition of the cycle race and was held from 8 June to 15 June 2003. The race started in Villard-de-Lans and finished in Grenoble. The race has no overall winner. Although Lance Armstrong originally won the event, he was stripped of the title due to violating anti-doping regulations. In 2012, the United States Anti-Doping Agency disqualified him from his results after 1 August 1998. The verdict was confirmed by the Union Cycliste Internationale.

Teams
Fifteen teams, containing a total of 120 riders, participated in the race:

Route

General classification

Notes

References

Further reading

External links

2003
2003 in French sport
Critérium du Dauphiné Libéré